Elih Christopher Villanueva (born July 26, 1986) is an American professional baseball pitcher and pitching coach for the Frederick Atlantic League Team of the Atlantic League of Professional Baseball. He played in Major League Baseball (MLB) for the Florida Marlins, who drafted him in the 27th round of the 2008 Major League Baseball draft out of Florida State University. He has also played in the Chinese Professional Baseball League (CPBL) for the Chinatrust Brothers and Rakuten Monkeys.

Amateur career
Villanueva was a 2004 graduate of Westminster Academy in Ft. Lauderdale, Florida where he posted a 1.15 ERA to go along with a 10–3 record on his way to earning second team All-State honors as a senior.

With Florida International he compiled a 7–3 record in his freshman season.

Villanueva transferred to Miami-Dade Community College in  where he was named the Florida Community College Activities Association Pitcher of the Year, the National Junior College Athletic Association second team All-American and first team All-State. He helped Miami Dade win the Southern Conference championship as he posted a 0.81 ERA striking out 109 batters in 89 innings of work. After the 2006 season, he played collegiate summer baseball with the Orleans Cardinals of the Cape Cod Baseball League.

He spent his Junior and Senior years at Florida State University.

Professional career

Florida/Miami Marlins
He started the season in the Rookie-level Gulf Coast Marlins where he pitched four scoreless innings in his lone Gulf Coast League start on July 19 against the Gulf Coast League Cardinals. Villanueva made five appearances, one start, for the Short-Season Jamestown Jammers of the New York–Penn League. He allowed one run over six innings in his lone start with the Jammers on September 3. Opponents hit .205 (15-for-73) against him. Villanueva was promoted to Class-A and went 1–0 with a 0.77 ERA in four games, two starts, for the Jupiter Hammerheads.

In  Villanueva pitched for Class-A Advanced Jupiter and the Double-A Jacksonville Suns. With the Hammerheads he went 9–12 with a 3.47 ERA in 26 games, 25 starts. With the Suns he went 0–1 with a 4.50 ERA in two games, both of them starts.  He helped the Suns to their fourth Southern League championship as a Marlins' affiliate. Villanueva threw five innings, allowing five hits, no walks, three runs, all earned, and striking out six to earn the win in the final game, however, this was not his main contribution. He hit a three-run go-ahead home run off of the Birmingham Barons pitcher, Andrew Cashner.

In 2010 Villanueva was a key figure leading the Jacksonville Suns to a second straight Southern League championship.  He was second on the team with 14 wins and 115 strikeouts, and lead the team with four complete games, three shutouts, 179 innings pitched.  He was named as a Topps Double-A All-Star, Southern League Post-Season All-Star, Southern League Mid-Season All-Star, and Southern League pitcher of the week for 8/16/2010.

On June 15, 2011, Villanueva was called up to replace Osvaldo Martínez. He made his Major League debut against the Philadelphia Phillies on June 15, 2011. He pitched three innings, giving up on eight runs, walking five and striking out two. His first major league strikeout was of Shane Victorino, earning the loss. He started the 2012 season and finished it with the New Orleans Zephyrs going 9-8-1 with a 3.90 ERA, a 1.45 WHIP, in 113 innings pitched with 44 walks, 83 strikeouts in 32 games played(16 starts). In 2013, he pitched at two levels: Rookie and Triple A. Combined, he threw 64 and a third innings, striking out 50 and walking 14. He had a 2.80 ERA, a 1.17 WHIP, and a 4–3 record. For 2014, he has pitched in 11 games(all starts) and has a 5–2 record with a 2.48 ERA, a 1.10 WHIP, 39 strikeouts, and 13 walks in 61.2 innings.

Baltimore Orioles
On February 28, 2015, Villanueva signed a minor league contract with the Baltimore Orioles organization. He spent the season with the Double-A Bowie Baysox and Triple-A Norfolk Tides before electing free agency on November 6, 2015.

Lancaster Barnstormers/Boston Red Sox
Villanueva took the 2016 season off of baseball. After a brief period with the independent Lancaster Barnstormers, the Boston Red Sox purchased his contract on June 4, 2017.  He elected free agency on November 6, 2017.

Chinatrust Brothers
On March 30, 2018, Villanueva signed with the Chinatrust Brothers of the Chinese Professional Baseball League as a foreign backup pitcher. He will pitch for the club's farm team and can only be promoted if one of the other three foreign pitchers on the active roster is released. On July 21, 2018, Villanueva was promoted to the Brothers following the release of pitcher Zack Segovia. On September 28, 2018, Villanueva pitched a no-hitter against the Lamigo Monkeys, becoming the 9th player in the history of the league to accomplish the feat, and the second one that season. He became a free agent following the season, but later re-signed with the team as their foreign backup pitcher on April 24, 2019. He was again promoted to the active roster on June 5, 2019. He became a free agent following the season.

Rakuten Monkeys
On February 8, 2020, Villanueva signed with the Rakuten Monkeys of the Chinese Professional Baseball League. Villanueva struggled to a 7.13 ERA in 12 games for Rakuten in 2020. He became a free agent after the season.

West Virginia Power
On April 5, 2021, Villanueva signed with the West Virginia Power of the Atlantic League of Professional Baseball. In 7 starts, Villanueva posted a 2–2 record with a 3.16 ERA and 37 strikeouts.

Sultanes de Monterrey
On July 8, 2021, Villanueva's contract was purchased by the Sultanes de Monterrey of the Mexican League. In 4 starts, he posted a 1–3 record with a 13.11 ERA over 11.2 innings. The Sultanes failed to qualify for the playoffs, and Villanueva became a free agent after the season.

West Virginia Power (second stint)
On August 7, 2021, Villanueva re-signed with the West Virginia Power of the Atlantic League of Professional Baseball. He became a free agent following the season.

Wild Health Genomes
On February 28, 2022, Villanueva signed with the Wild Health Genomes of the Atlantic League of Professional Baseball. He made 24 starts for the Genomes in 2022, working to a 12-9 record and 5.45 ERA with 151 strikeouts in 140.1 innings pitched.

Frederick Atlantic League Team
On February 17, 2023, Villanueva signed with the unnamed Frederick Atlantic League Team in the Atlantic League of Professional Baseball to serve as a player/coach for the 2023 season.

References

External links

Florida State Seminoles Bio

1986 births
Living people
Sportspeople from Coral Springs, Florida
Baseball players from Florida
Major League Baseball pitchers
Florida Marlins players
FIU Panthers baseball players
Miami Dade Sharks baseball players
Orleans Firebirds players
Florida State Seminoles baseball players
Gulf Coast Marlins players
Jamestown Jammers players
Jupiter Hammerheads players
Jacksonville Suns players
New Orleans Zephyrs players
Toros del Este players
Bowie Baysox players
Norfolk Tides players
Lancaster Barnstormers players
Portland Sea Dogs players
CTBC Brothers players
Rakuten Monkeys players
American expatriate baseball players in Taiwan
Águilas Cibaeñas players
American expatriate baseball players in the Dominican Republic
Charros de Jalisco players
West Virginia Power players
Sultanes de Monterrey players
American expatriate baseball players in Mexico